Fabio Santus (born Clusone, May 26, 1976) is an Italian cross country skier who has competed since 1995. His best World Cup finish was second in a 4 x 10 km event in Switzerland in 2007 while Santus's best individual finish was fifth in a 15 km + 15 km double pursuit event in Sweden in 2004.

Competing in two Winter Olympics, he earned his best finish of 16th in the 15 km + 15 km double pursuit event at Turin in 2006. Santus's best finish at the FIS Nordic World Ski Championships was 19th in the 50 km event at Val di Fiemme in 2003.  He also won the 2010 American Birkebeiner setting a record time of 1:56:58.2.

Cross-country skiing results
All results are sourced from the International Ski Federation (FIS).

Olympic Games

World Championships

World Cup

Season standings

Team podiums
 1 podium – (1 )

References

External links

Fan club site 

1976 births
Cross-country skiers at the 2002 Winter Olympics
Cross-country skiers at the 2006 Winter Olympics
Italian male cross-country skiers
Living people
Olympic cross-country skiers of Italy
People from Clusone
Cross-country skiers of Centro Sportivo Carabinieri
Sportspeople from the Province of Bergamo